is a fictional dish originating from Aristophanes' 391 B.C. comedy Assemblywomen, deriving from a transliteration of the Ancient Greek word . In A Greek–English Lexicon, it is defined as a "name of a dish compounded of all kinds of dainties, fish, flesh, fowl, and sauces".

It is the longest Greek word, containing 171 letters and 78 syllables. The transliteration has 183 Latin characters and is the longest word ever to appear in literature, according to the Guinness World Records (1990).

Variant forms 
The form of the word quoted here is the version listed in the Liddell & Scott Greek lexicon (1940) and quoted therein as being amended by August Meineke, contrasting F.W. Hall and W.M. Geldart's 1907 edition of Aristophanis Comoediae (used in the Assemblywomen play) variant of (differences in bold): .

Description 
The dish was a fricassée, with at least 16 sweet and sour ingredients, including the following:
 Fish slices
 Fish of the elasmobranchii subclass (a shark or ray)
 Rotted dogfish or small shark's head
 A generally sharp-tasting dish of several ingredients grated and pounded together
 Silphion, possibly a kind of giant fennel, now believed extinct
 A kind of crab, shrimp, or crayfish
 Honey poured down
 Wrasse (or thrush)
 A kind of sea fish or blackbird as topping
 Wood pigeon
 Domestic pigeon
 Rooster
 The roasted head of dabchick
 Hare, which could be a kind of bird or a kind of sea hare
 New wine boiled down
 Wing and/or fin

Context 
The term is used in the ultimate chorus of the play, when Blepyrus (and the audience) are summoned to the first feast laid on by the new system.

English translations 
In English prose translation by Leo Strauss (1966), this Greek word is rendered as "oysters-saltfish-skate-sharks'-heads-left-over-vinegar-dressing-laserpitium-leek-with-honey-sauce-thrush-blackbird-pigeon-dove-roast-cock's-brains-wagtail-cushat-hare-stewed-in-new-wine-gristle-of-veal-pullet's-wings".

English verse translation by Benjamin Bickley Rogers (1902) follows the original meter and the original form of composition:

An older English verse translation by Rev. Rowland Smith (1833) breaks the original word into several verses:

See also 

 Longest word in English

References 

Ancient Greek comedy
Ancient Greek cuisine
Aristophanes
Fictional food and drink
Greek words and phrases
Long words
Nonce words
Words and phrases with no direct English translation